Days of Our Lives is an American daytime television soap opera created by Ted and Betty Corday. It first aired on NBC on November 8, 1965. The following is a list of awards and nominations the show's crew and cast have received.

Daytime Emmy Awards

Outstanding Drama Series

Outstanding Lead Actor in a Drama Series

Outstanding Lead Actress in a Drama Series

Outstanding Supporting Actor in a Drama Series

Outstanding Supporting Actress in a Drama Series

Outstanding Younger Actor in a Drama Series

Outstanding Younger Actress in a Drama Series

Outstanding Drama Series Writing Team

Other Daytime Emmy awards

Directors Guild of America Awards

GLAAD Media Awards

People's Choice Awards

PRISM Awards

Writers Guild of America Awards

Best Television Writing in a Daytime Drama

Young Artist Awards

Other awards

References

Days of Our Lives
Days of Our Lives